A Rage to Live is a 1965 American drama film directed by Walter Grauman and starring Suzanne Pleshette as a woman whose passions wreak havoc on her life. The screenplay by John T. Kelley is based on the 1949 novel of the same name by John O'Hara.

Plot
The sexual voraciousness of newspaper heiress Grace Caldwell threatens to destroy the reputation of her wealthy Pennsylvania family.  As a precocious teenager, she is assaulted in her room in her own house by her older brother Brock's friend Charlie Jay, to whom she finally yields willingly, the first of a long series of lovers. Grace understands her weakness but goes on in her path of seduction, until she meets San Francisco real estate broker Sidney Tate at a Christmas party. The two fall in love and he proposes marriage. Grace confesses her past but despite being taken aback, Sidney marries her and she commits herself to a relationship, a pledge she keeps for the first few years of their union, which produces a son and a seemingly idyllic life on a farm.

Problems ensue when lusty contractor Roger Bannon, the son of one of her mother's former servants, confesses to Grace he's been in love with her for years. An affair ensues and when she eventually ends it, he becomes enraged, gets drunk, and accidentally crashes his truck, killing himself. Reports of his death include details about his tryst with Grace, rumors which reach her husband. Under pressure, Grace admits her guilt to him and swears it will never happen again.  At this point, however, the wife of newspaper editor Jack Hollister, who is also in love with Grace, makes a scene during a charity ball accusing Grace of seducing her husband. Sidney, who witnesses the scene, is once more convinced that his wife has lied to him and goes away. Grace runs after him, swearing she had nothing with Jack Hollister. Still, Sidney departs, leaving her behind in a state of despair.

Cast

Original Novel
The novel was O'Hara's fourth book and his first in eleven years. The New York Times called it "his most ambitious book. It is by no means entirely successful, but it does express a vibrant vitality."

O'Hara said his earlier books "were special books about specialised people; but this is the big one, the over-all one."

The novel was a best seller.

Text displayed after credits
At the end of the film, these lines of an Alexander Pope poem are displayed:

Production
Film rights were bought by the Mirisch Corporation in 1959; the Mirisches had a deal with United Artists. The sale was on similar terms to O'Hara's From the Terrace – instead of selling the book for a flat price of $500,000 they had a five-year lease to make the film, with a down payment of $100,000 and O'Hara got 25% of the profits.

The novel was one of a series of properties the Mirisches bought around this time, others including Hawaii, West Side Story and Two for the Seesaw.

In July 1963 John T Kelly was reported as working on the script.

By May 1964 Lewis J Rachmill was assigned to produce, Walter Graumann was the director and Suzanne Pleshette had been cast in the lead. Graumann had just made 633 Squadron for the Mirisches. Ben Gazzara was given a male lead; it was his first film since finishing Arrest and Trial. Bradford Dillman played the other male lead.

Filming started 1 June 1964.

Grauman later signed to do three more films with the Mirisches.

Critical reception
Variety said, "In this banal transfer from tome to film, the characters in John O'Hara's A Rage to Live have retained their two-dimensional unreality ... Nympho heroine goes from man to man amidst corny dialog and inept direction which combine to smother all thesps."

TV Guide rates it  out of a possible four stars and adds, "In the transfer from novel to screen, O'Hara's characters have been transformed from vital, living personalities into stiff, unmotivated soap opera fodder."

Awards and nominations
Howard Shoup was nominated for the Academy Award for Best Costume Design, Black and White but lost to Julie Harris for Darling.

References

External links

1965 films
1965 drama films
American black-and-white films
American drama films
Films about sex addiction
Films based on American novels
Films directed by Walter Grauman
Films scored by Nelson Riddle
Films set in Pennsylvania
United Artists films
1960s English-language films
1960s American films